Wilt were an alternative rock band founded in Kilkenny, Ireland in 1998. Formed by ex-Kerbdog members Cormac Battle on vocals/guitar and Darragh Butler on drums, the line-up was completed with their friend Mick Murphy on bass.

Wilt played their first gig at The Funnel in Dublin on 26 March 1998. Their debut album, Bastinado, was released in July 2000. Wexford native Derren Dempsey joined on guitar/backing vocals as a live touring member in 2002 to promote their second album, My Medicine.

Although Rock Sound magazine tipped them as being Ireland's version of Hüsker Dü and Weezer, Wilt broke up in 2003.

Discography

Singles / E.P.s

Albums

Other

Radio Sessions

Covered songs featured on their singles
 "April Skies" – Jesus And Mary Chain
 "Mercy Seat" – Ultra Vivid Scene
 "Mansion on the Hill" – Bruce Springsteen

References

Musical groups established in 1998
Musical groups disestablished in 2002
Irish alternative rock groups